O is the first full-length album from Eiko Shimamiya, it includes the hit single Higurashi no Naku Koro ni (opening from the same-titled anime). A limited edition with a DVD including the music video of Higurashi no Naku Koro ni is available. The album charted for five weeks on the Oricon charts and sold 10,000 copies.

Track listing

Credits
 Eiko Shimamiya: Lyrics (excepting Sora no Mahoroba) and music (excepting Higurashi no Naku Koro ni)
 Kazuya Takase: Arrangement for tracks 1, 4, 7, and 11.
 Tomoyuki Nakazawa: Arrangement for tracks 2 and 11. Music for track 11.
 SORMA: Arrangement for tracks 6 and 8.
 Maiko Iuchi: Arrangement for tracks 5 and 12.
 Additional arrangement: Jyunpei Fujita, C.G mix, Yui Isshiki respectively for tracks 3, 9, and 10.

2006 albums
Eiko Shimamiya albums